Black Dialogue is the debut studio album by American hip hop group The Perceptionists. It was released on Definitive Jux on March 22, 2005.

Critical reception

At Metacritic, which assigns a weighted average score out of 100 to reviews from mainstream critics, Black Dialogue received an average score of 81, based on 7 reviews, indicating "universal acclaim".

Andy Kellman of AllMusic gave the album 4 out of 5 stars, saying, "Lif and Akrobatik have a long history, so they sound natural as brainy verse-swapping partners, and they're sharp throughout, whether they have their sights set on the Bush Administration or are simply batting boasts back and forth." Nathan Rabin of The A.V. Club said, "on the whole, Black Dialogue emerges as a triumph, an impassioned 12-track hip-hop manifesto even a mother could love, assuming of course, she hasn't affixed a Bush/Cheney sticker on the bumper of the family station wagon."

Dylan Hicks of City Pages called it "a leftist party record: alarmed but not paranoid, disgusted but not defeated, convinced that radicals are born on the dance floor and thus never guilty about composing love raps and having a good time." Derek Beres of XLR8R said: "Social theory and musical aesthetic find kindred partnership on Black Dialogue."

Rolling Stone placed it at number 36 on the "Top 50 Records of 2005" list.

Track listing

In other media
A few of their songs from the album even appeared in several video games, mostly by Electronic Arts. "Let's Move" appeared in NBA Live 06 and Need For Speed: Most Wanted, while "People for Prez" appeared in SSX On Tour. "Party Hard" appeared in ATV Offroad Fury 4, DJ Hero 2 (as DLC), and Skate 3.

Charts

References

External links
 

2005 debut albums
Definitive Jux albums
Mr. Lif albums
Akrobatik albums
Albums produced by El-P